Sharmistha Dubey is an Indian American business executive. She was the chief executive officer (CEO) of Match Group from March 2020 to May 2022. Dubey joined Match Group in 2006. Dubey also serves on the Board of Directors of Match Group and Fortive Corporation.

Biography 
Dubey grew up in Jamshedpur and did her schooling from Loyola School. She earned a bachelor's degree in engineering from Indian Institute of Technology(IIT) Kharagpur in 1993. She was the only woman metallurgical engineer that year and Sundar Pichai was a classmate, and said she almost quit in her first week. After graduation, Dubey returned to her hometown and worked for a steel company for a year, before saving up enough money to attend Ohio State University. Dubey later obtained an MS from Ohio State University.

Dubey is married to Partha and has one daughter.

Career 
Dubey began her career in 1998, as an engineer for Texas Instruments, before joining supply chain management software company i2 technologies. Dubey joined Match.com in 2006, serving in multiple roles like president of Match Group Americas, chief product officer of Match and chief product officer and EVP of The Princeton Review. Dubey additionally served as EVP for Tutor.com from 2013-2014.

Dubey was appointed Chief Operating Officer (COO) of Tinder in 2017, led the launch of Tinder Gold which established Tinder as the highest grossing non-gaming app globally. On January 1, 2018, Dubey was appointed President of Match Group and joined its board of directors in 2019.

On March 1, 2020 Dubey was promoted to CEO, succeeding Mandy Ginsberg who stepped down for personal reasons. Dubey began her tenure as CEO for Match Group just as the COVID-19 pandemic was hitting the US and three months before the company spun off from IAC. In an email dated May 2020, Dubey and Match Group reported that engagement was up for all brands, despite the pandemic, due in part to video dating offerings.

As of February 2020, when Dubey became CEO, 30% of adults in the US used online dating, up from 11% in 2013, according to Pew Research Center report.

In August 2020, Fortive Corporation announced the appointment of Shar to its board of directors.

In May 2022, Dubey stepped down as CEO of Match Group and was replaced by Bernard Kim (previously from Zynga). Dubey remained a director of Match Group.

Activism
On September 1, 2021, the Texas Heartbeat Act went into effect. Previously, the Supreme Court of the United States denied a motion to block enforcement in a 5-4 vote. Dubey announced that she would be creating a fund to assist Texas-based employees and their dependents who were impacted by the legislation stating that "I personally, as a woman in Texas, could not keep silent" and "I am shocked that I now live in a state where women's reproductive laws are more regressive than most of the world, including India." She indicated that the fund would cover expenses for those who needed to seek care outside of Texas. She made clear that this was a personal fund, and not on behalf of Match.com.

References 

Living people
Ohio State University College of Engineering alumni
Indian Institutes of Technology alumni
Indian women chief executives
American women chief executives
1971 births
21st-century American women